Perry Grant (January 26, 1924 – December 12, 2004) was an American producer and screenwriter. He was the co-creator of the American sitcom television series Hello, Larry, which he created with his writing partner Dick Bensfield.

Early life 
Grant was born in San Diego, California. He graduated from the University of California, later working for A.O. Smith as the regional advertising manager. During World War II he had served in the Navy in the Pacific, where he wrote humorous magazine stories about life in the navy.

Career 
Grant started his screenwriting career in 1952, writing for The Adventures of Ozzie and Harriet, where he met Dick Bensfield. Bensfield and Grant wrote for The Adventures of Ozzie and Harriet until its final season.

Grant and Bensfield later produced and wrote for numerous television programs including The Andy Griffith Show, The Odd Couple, I Dream of Jeannie, Good Times, Mayberry R.F.D., The Doris Day Show, Happy Days, One Day at a Time, The Partridge Family, The Jeffersons, 227 and The Lucy Show.

In 1979 Grant and Bensfield created the new NBC sitcom television series Hello, Larry. He retired from television in 1987.

Death 
Grant died in December 2004 of complications from alzheimer's disease, at his home in Pacific Palisades, California, at the age of 80.

References

External links 

Rotten Tomatoes profile

1924 births
2004 deaths
People from San Diego
Deaths from dementia in California
Deaths from Alzheimer's disease
American male screenwriters
American television writers
Television producers from California
American male television writers
American producers
20th-century American screenwriters
University of California, Berkeley alumni
United States Navy personnel of World War II